Lev Sargsyan (born 12 October 1996) is an Armenian diver. He competed in the men's 10 m synchro platform event at the 2018 European Aquatics Championships, winning the bronze medal. He and his partner Vladimir Harutyunyan won the first medal for Armenia at the European Aquatics Championships.

References

1996 births
Living people
Armenian male divers
Place of birth missing (living people)
European Championships (multi-sport event) bronze medalists